Juanita Jennings (born September 12, 1952) is an American actress, known for her roles on television.

Career
Jennings won the 1994 CableACE Award for Supporting Actress in a Movie or Miniseries for her role in Laurel Avenue. She guest-starred in many television series, including The Fresh Prince of Bel-Air, Ellen, Chicago Hope, 7th Heaven, Touched by an Angel, The Practice, Soul Food and Justified. Her stage credits include playing Rose Maxson in South Coast Repertory's production of August Wilson's Fences.

Jennings may best known for her series regular role in the TBS sitcom Meet the Browns as Edna Barnes, which she starred from 2009 to 2011. She had a recurring roles in The Division, The Bold and the Beautiful and most notable in Fox prime time soap opera Star from 2017 to 2019. In 2019, she had a recurring roles in USA Network legal drama Pearson and Oprah Winfrey Network drama David Makes Man.

Filmography

Film

Television

References

External links

African-American actresses
Living people
1952 births
American film actresses
American voice actresses
American stage actresses
American television actresses
21st-century African-American people
21st-century African-American women
20th-century African-American people
20th-century African-American women